Clubul Sportiv Municipal Focșani, commonly known as CSM Focșani, or simply Focșani, is a Romanian professional football club from Focşani, Vrancea County, founded in 1953 as Spartac Focșani.

History
The club was founded in 1953 as Spartac Focșani and over its history had various names like: Progresul, Rapid, Fructexport, Acord, Diplomatic and the most popular for Romanian football fans Unirea. 

During its tumultuous history CSM Focșani had a lot of ups and downs and also another two refounding moments, in 2002 and 2006, but the highest level achieved by the team was only Liga II. 

Than the team was dissolved again in the summer of 2013, but only at senior level. In the summer of 2016, the senior team was refounded and enrolled in Liga IV – Vrancea County.

Chronology of names

Stadium
CSM Focșani plays its home matches on Stadionul Milcovul from Focșani, which has a capacity of 8,500 seats.

Honours
Liga III
Winners (5): 1973–74, 1978–79, 1985–86, 1998–99, 2006–07
Runners-up (3): 1968–69, 1977–78, 2021–22
Liga IV – Vrancea County
Winners (1): 2016–17

Players

First-team squad

Out on loan

Club officials

Board of directors

Current technical staff

League history

References

External links
 Official website
 

Multi-sport clubs in Romania
Football clubs in Vrancea County
Association football clubs established in 1953
Liga II clubs
Liga III clubs
Liga IV clubs
1953 establishments in Romania
CSM Focșani